Thurston County is a county in the U.S. state of Nebraska. As of the 2010 United States Census, the population was 6,940. Its county seat is Pender.

In the Nebraska license plate system, Thurston County is represented by the prefix 55 (it had the 55th-largest number of vehicles registered in the county when the license plate system was established in 1922).

The Siouan-speaking Omaha and Ho-Chunk (Ho-Chunk) have reservations in Thurston County. The two reservations combined comprise the county's entire land area.

History
Varying cultures of indigenous peoples lived along the rivers for hundreds of years before European encounter. The Omaha occupied this territory and much of Nebraska and western Iowa before the Europeans arrived. They had migrated west from the Ohio Valley under pressure from the Iroquois Confederacy in the early 17th century.

Thurston County was organized by European Americans in 1889 from land that had been divided between Dakota and Burt counties since the dissolution of Blackbird County in 1879. It was named for US Senator John M. Thurston.

Geography
Thurston County lies on the east side of Nebraska. Its east boundary line abuts the west boundary line of the state of Iowa, across the Missouri River. The west portion of the county is drained by the Logan Creek Drainage, which flows south-southeast. The land area of the county is completely comprised from the Omaha and Winnebago Indian reservations.

Major highways

  U.S. Highway 75
  U.S. Highway 77
  Nebraska Highway 9
  Nebraska Highway 16
  Nebraska Highway 94

Adjacent counties

 Dakota County - north
 Woodbury County, Iowa - northeast
 Monona County, Iowa - east
 Burt County - southeast
 Cuming County - southwest
 Wayne County - west
 Dixon County - northwest

Demographics

As of the 2020 United States Census The racial make up of the county was 36.1% non-Hispanic white, .4% African American, 57.5% Native American, .1% Asian, and 3.8% Hispanic.

As of the 2000 United States Census, there were 7,171 people, 2,255 households, and 1,725 families in the county. The population density was 18 people per square mile (7/km2). There were 2,467 housing units at an average density of 6 per square mile (2/km2). The racial makeup of the county was 45.77% White, 0.15% Black or African American, 52.03% Native American, 0.06% Asian, 0.77% from other races, and 1.23% from two or more races. Hispanic or Latino of any race were 2.43% of the population. 25.9% were of German ancestry. The villages of Emerson, Rosalie, Pender, and Thurston are predominantly white, while the villages of Macy, Walthill, and Winnebago are predominantly Native American.

There were 2,255 households, out of which 40.00% had children under the age of 18 living with them, 50.60% were married couples living together, 19.10% had a female householder with no husband present, and 23.50% were non-families. 21.30% of all households were made up of individuals, and 10.10% had someone living alone who was 65 years of age or older. The average household size was 3.14 and the average family size was 3.64.

The county population contained 36.80% under the age of 18, 8.30% from 18 to 24, 23.90% from 25 to 44, 17.70% from 45 to 64, and 13.20% who were 65 years of age or older. The median age was 30 years. For every 100 females there were 99.40 males. For every 100 females age 18 and over, there were 95.40 males.

The median income for a household in the county was $28,170, and the median income for a family was $30,893. Males had a median income of $24,792 versus $20,481 for females. The per capita income for the county was $10,951. About 19.30% of families and 25.60% of the population were below the poverty line, including 32.60% of those under age 18 and 14.70% of those age 65 or over.

Politics

In recent decades, Native Americans in the United States have become more active politically, voting in increasing numbers in local, state and national elections. In 2004, Thurston, a majority-Native American county, was the only one in Nebraska with a majority voting for the Democratic Party presidential candidate, John Kerry.

Voter interest was high, and the 2008 presidential election was preceded by a major voter registration drive. The majority of voters in Thurston County voted for Democratic candidate Barack Obama, making the county one of four such in the state. In the 2012 presidential election, Thurston was the only Nebraska county that voted for Obama in his successful re-election bid. In 2016 and 2020, the county moved towards Donald Trump by relatively narrow margins.

The predominantly Native American communities in the east of the county (Winnebago, Walthill and Macy) lean Democratic, but despite them having more population altogether than the Republican predominantly white communities in the west of the county, they sport lower voter turnouts.

Communities

Villages 

 Emerson (partial)
 Pender (county seat)
 Rosalie
 Thurston
 Walthill
 Winnebago

Census-designated place
 Macy

Townships

 Anderson
 Blackbird
 Bryan
 Dawes
 Flournoy
 Merry
 Omaha
 Pender
 Perry
 Thayer
 Winnebago

See also
 National Register of Historic Places listings in Thurston County, Nebraska

References

External links
 Omaha Tribe of Nebraska
 Winnebago Tribe of Nebraska

 
Nebraska counties on the Missouri River
1889 establishments in Nebraska
Populated places established in 1889